Leis Cottage, also known as Camp Leisure, is a historic cure cottage located at Saranac Lake in the town of Harrietstown, Franklin County, New York.  It was built in 1904 and is a -story, L-shaped wood-frame structure with a gable roof and projecting cross-gable in the Queen Anne style.  It has a large verandah and second story sleeping porch. It features a cobblestone chimney and porte cochere.  Henry Leis, who operated a piano and music store, also owned the Leis Block.

It was listed on the National Register of Historic Places in 1992.

References

Houses on the National Register of Historic Places in New York (state)
Queen Anne architecture in New York (state)
Houses completed in 1904
Houses in Franklin County, New York
National Register of Historic Places in Franklin County, New York